Justice League Quarterly (JLQ) was a quarterly American comic book series published by DC Comics from Winter 1990 to Winter 1994; it lasted 17 issues. It had a variable cast, pulling from the Justice League membership. The title centred on short stories featuring a differing number of characters, often solo stories, and in later issues often featured a pin-up section of members of the Justice League. Various writers and artists worked on the title.

Featured characters (by frequency of appearance)

Five or more issues
 Blue Beetle (Ted Kord)
 Booster Gold
 Crimson Fox
 Elongated Man
 Fire
 Flash (Wally West)
 Guy Gardner
 Ice
 Martian Manhunter
 Maxwell Lord
 Power Girl

Up to five issues

 Batman
 Bloodwynd (Martian Manhunter)
 Blue Jay
 Bushmaster
 Captain Atom
 Dr. Light
 Dr. Mist
 Echo (IV)
 General Glory (Joseph Jones)
 Godiva
 Green Lantern (Hal Jordan)
 Impala
 Jack O'Lantern (Marvin Noronsa)
 Jack O'Lantern (Liam McHugh)
 Kilowog
 L-Ron

 Maxima
 Metamorpho
 Oberon
 Olympian
 Owlwoman
 Ray (Ray Terrill)
 Rising Sun
 Rocket Red
 Seraph
 Silver Sorceress
 Sue Dibny
 Tasmanian Devil
 Thunderbolt
 Thunderlord
 Tuatara
 Wild Huntsman

Single issue

 Arion
 Aquaman
 Big Sir
 Black Canary (Dinah Lance)
 Cascade
 Centrix
 Chaon
 Chrysalis
 Clock King
 Cluemaster
 Dr. Light (Kimiyo Hoshi)
 Flash (Barry Allen)
 General Glory 
 Gentleman Ghost
 Geo-Force
 G'nort
 Gypsy
 Hardline
 High Abbot
 Jesse Quick
 Judomaster (Andreas Havoc)

 Major Disaster
 Maxi-Man
 Mighty Bruce
 Mister Miracle (Scott Free)
 Multi-Man
 Nightshade
 Nuklon
 Rebis
 Red Star
 Reverb
 Sarge Steel
 Scarlet Skier
 Starman
 Superman
 Templar
 Tundra
 Ultraa
 Valor
 Vapor
 Warrior (Guy Gardner)
 Wonder Woman

See also
 Justice League
 Justice League International
 Justice League Europe

External links
 Title Index at the DCU Guide, detailing each issue

Comics by J. M. DeMatteis
Comics by Paul Kupperberg
Defunct American comics